Wilhelm Beyer  (22 March 1885 in Hohenmölsen – 11 April 1945 in Schermcke) was a German politician and functionary of the Nazi Party (NSDAP).

Life 
Beyer grew up in Hohenmölsen, where he attended elementary school, and later worked in various industries as an apprentice. In 1902 he joined the 7. Thuringian Infantry Regiment No. 96 in Naumburg. As a military trainee, he went to the Royal Police in Kiel. In 1919 he was called as a Post assistant to the postal service. He was promoted to secretary and later chief post secretary. On 1 October 1931, he left the postal service because of illness.

Beyer joined the Nazi party in 1925. On 29 November 1930 he was given mandate as a city councilor in Essen.

After the National Socialist seizure he received in November 1933 in the constituency 23 (Düsseldorf West) a mandate in the Reichstag where he served until 1945. Beyer died on a business trip to Hamburg in combat in the final phase of the Second World War.

References

1885 births
1945 deaths
Nazi Party politicians
Members of the Reichstag of Nazi Germany
German civilians killed in World War II